Kinross Wolaroi School is an independent Uniting Church co-educational early learning, primary, and secondary day and boarding school, located in Orange, a rural city  west of Sydney, New South Wales, Australia.

The school was originally established in 1886 as Wolaroi Methodist Boys College, also known as Wolaroi College Orange. The modern school however was formed in 1975 with the merger between Wolaroi Methodist Boys College and The Kinross School, which was also known as Presbyterian Ladies' College, Orange (PLC). Kinross Wolaroi is a non-selective school and currently caters for approximately 1,110 students from early learning, through Year K to Year 12, including 350 boarders. They do this through the three separate areas of the school that operate. Those being the; Pre-Preparatory School; The Preparatory School; and The Senior School. , classes and boys boarding occur at the former Wolaroi site on Bathurst Road, while girl boarders live at the former PLC site on Coronation Drive.

With the merger of the schools the previous latin mottos were abandoned and in 2008, the school adopted the new Latin motto of Scientia, Amicitias, Integritas (Knowledge, Friendship, Integrity). The school's five core values are Courage, Respect, Inclusiveness, Resilience and Commitment.

History

Wolaroi Methodist Boys College
Weymouth House, a small privately owned school for boys, was established in 1886, in the Union Bank building, Orange. The school was established by Mr Thomas Richards, the sole owner and teacher, having come to Orange from All Saints College in Bathurst. The school was a success, and in 1893 the Wolaroi mansion, built by Mr John Charles McLachlan, was purchased, enabling the boys to move to a larger campus. The move led to a change of name for the school, to Wolaroi Grammar School.

In 1913, Mr Charles Campbell secured the site and became the third headmaster. In 1925 however, Mr Connell who had succeeded Campbell left Orange and the school consequently closed. This provided an opportunity for the Methodist Church to secure the site and the continuation of a boy's college in Western New South Wales.

In 1925, the Methodist Church took control of the school and changed the name of the school again, this time to Wolaroi Methodist Boys College. The college reopened in 1926 under the direction of Mr Stanley Brown who continued to expand the school and increase the diversity of subjects and programs offered at Wolaroi. He is widely credited with having saved the college from financial ruin. As thanks the College Council named the entrance gates to the school 'The Stanley Brown Memorial Gates'.

The school continued to flourish in the years following the Second World War until a drought hit the region in the 1970s. In 1973, suffering financial difficulties and with changing societal attitudes, the college decided to become fully co-educational. This culminated with the Methodist Church asking The Kinross School to take over the management of Wolaroi College in 1975.

Presbyterian Ladies' College / The Kinross School
There had been substantial scottish immigration to Orange since its foundation in the 19th century which had led to a sizeable Presbyterian community. Throughout the 1920's the Presbyterian community realised that there was a need for the establishment of a girl's school that could provide a well-rounded education based upon the ideals found within reformed Christianity. In response to this The Presbyterian Ladies' College (PLC) opened in Orange in 1928 on a 43-acre site, named "Campdale". With Miss Eleanor Linck as its first Headmistress.

P.L.C. Orange had been open for eight years when Miss Ina Miller became Headmistress. For the next 33 years she would shape the direction of the College and set very high standards for the student body as well as staff.

In 1973, PLC also became co-educational, and changed its name to The Kinross School. During this time Wolaroi was in financial difficulty and the Methodist Church approached the Presbyterian Church to take over management of Wolaroi. In 1975 The Kinross School took over the management of Wolaroi and became Kinross Wolaroi School.

Kinross Wolaroi School
The Kinross School Council accepted the responsibilities of Wolaroi College, and in 1975 the schools amalgamated to become Kinross Wolaroi School. With the creation of the Uniting Church in Australia in 1977, the School became a part of that Church.

After initial difficulties the school flourished in the region and a new era of development began. The direction came under the leadership of the schools second Headmaster, Mr Alan Anderson.

After a period of rapid expansion and after having pursued an aggressive marketing strategy in Western NSW to attract more regional boarder's the school entered a period of consolidation. This involved the upgrading and maintenance of the schools existing facilities and infrastructure. This expansion saw students being able to be involved in a variety of programs from drama and music to cadets, sport and the Duke of Edinburgh award scheme.

By 1988 the school had grown to 728 students and was now the largest co-educational boarding school in New South Wales, with 384 boarders.

New Zealand born Reverend David Williams was appointed as the third Headmaster in 2002. He was succeeded by Mr Brian Kennelly in 2007. Under Mr Kennelly's leadership the school continued to expand and flourish, with an extensive building program being undertaken on the Wolaroi site, to upgrade much of the aging infrastructure such as the auditorium and many classroom facilities

In 2016 the school had its 130-year anniversary and Dr Andrew Parry took over as the fifth Headmaster of Kinross Wolaroi School and the school has continued to expand and flourish.

A former Preparatory School Principal at Kinross Wolaroi, John Thomas Kennett, was in 1998 convicted on a range of charges for sex offences against 12 boys.

Today, the School provides co-education and single-sex boarding using its two main campuses. Classes and boys boarding occurs at the Wolaroi Site on Bathurst Road, while female boarders live at the PLC Site on Coronation Drive.

List of Former Headmasters

Boarding And Day Houses 
The school has eight days houses and eight boarding houses. With the day houses being mixed sex as well as being a mix between day students and boarders. Whereas the boarding houses are sex segregated. With the girls boarding houses being located on the PLC site and the boys boarding houses being located on the Wolaroi site.

Day Houses 
Brown House: Was established in 1941 and names after Mr Stanley G. Brown the first Headmaster of Wolaroi College following its sale to the Methodist Church in 1925.

McLachlan House: Was established in 1969 and names after Mr John Charles McLachlan, the original owner of the Wolaroi Mansion.

Douglas House: Was named after Mr James Stuart Douglas who was one of the founding members of PLC Orange and Chairman of the PLC Council from 1932 to 1933.

Gordon House: Was established in 1950 and named after Mr D.W.T. Gordon and his family who had long associations with PLC Orange since its foundation.

Dean House: Was established in 1986 in honour of Mr William Douglas Johnston Dean, the first chair of the Kinross Wolaroi School Council 1975–1976.

Richards House: Was established in 1986 and named after Mr T.H. Richards, owner, headmaster and sole teacher of the initial school, Weymouth House which opened in June 1886.

Williams House: Was established in 2016 and named after Rev. David Williams, former Headmaster of Kinross Wolaroi School from 2002 to 2006.

Blackman House: Was established in 2016 and named after Rev. Everard Harley Blackman OAM, the school chaplain at Kinross Wolaroi School from 1979 to 1989.

Boarding Houses 
There are four boys boarding houses, located on the Wolaroi site, and four girls boarding houses, located on the PLC site.

The boys boarding houses are; Wolaroi; Trathan; Tower; and Weymouth.

The girls boarding houses are; Stuart-Douglas; New; Miller; and Loader

Co-curricular activities

Cadets
The Kinross Wolaroi School Cadet Unit (KWSCU) was established over 60 years ago, and today has a Unit strength of 300 cadets. KWSCU is a member of the Australia Services' Cadet Scheme, with a total enrolment of approximately 23,000 cadets Australia-wide. Unless a student is selected in the band or orchestra, membership of the Cadet Unit is compulsory for all students in semester two of Year 7, Year 8 and the first semester of Year 9, with further service encouraged following the award of rank. A camp, bivouacs and leadership courses are held annually. The unit parades through Orange on Anzac Day, and also conducts a farewell parade to Senior Cadets (Year 12) and band members, and in recent years a Ceremonial Parade on Open Day. A formal mess night is held annually for the Senior Cadets and Band members, their parents, and officers.

Each platoon is commanded by a Cadet Under Officer (CUO), with the assistance of a Platoon Sergeant (SGT), and is divided into three sections, with each led by a Corporal (CPL). Rank is attained after a cadet with suitable experience attends and passes the relevant promotion course. Typically, a CUO is in Year 11, and has served for four years in the cadet corp.

Music
The co-curricular music programme at Kinross Wolaroi includes elective instrumental, musicianship, vocal tuition, and a range of ensemble music, including an orchestra, concert band, stage band, chamber strings, chamber choir and many more. Instrumental and vocal tuition occurs during the normal school day with individual students attending lessons once a week. Students may also choose to study musicianship in groups according to grade level.

The Regional Engagement Enterprise (TREE) 
In 2017, Kinross Wolaroi School launched The Regional Engagement Enterprise (TREE) initiative, which provides community-based learning experiences, especially opportunities in local agribusinesses, for all students from Kindergarten to Year 12.

Sport
The Kinross Wolaroi Prep School is a member school of both the Heads of Independent Co-Educational Schools (HICES) and Junior School Heads Association of Australia (JSHAA). Through these organisations, students have the opportunity to participate in Athletics, Swimming and Cross-Country through to a national level. Boys and girls from Kindergarten to Year 6 may play in a sports team during the winter season, and from Years 3 to 6 in the summer season. Sport is then compulsory for all students from Year 3 onwards.

In the Senior school, boys may participate in sports such as rugby, soccer, cricket, cross country, basketball, water polo, swimming, rowing and tennis. Girls may compete in sports such as hockey, netball, basketball, waterpolo, swimming, aerobics, squash, diving, rowing, softball, soccer and tennis. Sporting competition in the senior school is facilitated through the school's membership in a number of associations, including Orange Town Competitions, Western Associated Schools (WAS), Independent Schools Association (ISA), Association of Independent Co-Educational Schools (AICES), and NSW Combined Independent Schools (CIS).

Other activities
In addition to sport, music, and the Cadet Unit, a number of other activities are available to students. These include: the Duke of Edinburgh Award Scheme, stud cattle, cattle paraders, ski tour, public speaking, debating, art club, archives, computer club, photography club, crusaders, community service, peer support, young achievers, student representative council and library.

Affiliations
Kinross Wolaroi School is affiliated with the Association of Heads of Independent Schools of Australia (AHISA), the Junior School Heads Association of Australia (JSHAA), the Australian Boarding Schools' Association (ABSA), Association of Independent Co-Educational Schools (AICES) and is an associate member of the Independent Schools Association (ISA). In 2021 Kinross also joined the Round Square international schools program

Notable alumni 
Alumni of Kinross Wolaroi School, Kinross School, the Presbyterian Ladies' College, Orange, or Wolaroi College may elect to join the Kinross Wolaroi Ex-Students' Association.

 Jason Belmonte - professional tenpin bowler

 Janet Carr – physiotherapist and academic
 Susan Cullen-Ward - Susan, Queen of the Albanians
 Ashleigh Gardner- cricketer
 Ben McCalman – Wallabies rugby union player
 Belinda Neal – former Labor Senator for NSW (1994-1998) and former Member for Robertson (2007-2010)

 Ian Stapleton – architect
 John Sumegi – Olympic Silver Medalist in Canoeing 1980
 Jone Tawake – Brumbies rugby union player
 Cody Walker - Waratahs rugby union player

 Anna Windsor – swimmer who competed at the Atlanta and Sydney Olympic Games

See also 

 List of non-government schools in New South Wales
 List of boarding schools in Australia
 Independent Schools Association

References

Further reading
Butt, M.F. 1978. Presbyterian Ladies' College, Orange - A Journal. Orange, G.H Craig.
Potts, J.C. 1978. Wolaroi College, Orange: A Pictorial History

External links 
 Kinross Wolaroi School website

Boarding schools in New South Wales
Private primary schools in New South Wales
Private secondary schools in New South Wales
Educational institutions established in 1886
Junior School Heads Association of Australia Member Schools
Independent Schools Association (Australia)
1886 establishments in Australia
Uniting Church schools in Australia
Orange, New South Wales